Shahpur City railway station is  located in  Pakistan.

See also
 Pakistan Railways

References

External links

Railway stations in Sargodha District